Banks Island is one of the larger members of the Arctic Archipelago. Situated in the Inuvik Region, and part of the Inuvialuit Settlement Region, of the Northwest Territories, it is separated from Victoria Island to its east by the Prince of Wales Strait and from the mainland by Amundsen Gulf to its south. The Beaufort Sea lies to its west, and to its northeast M'Clure Strait separates the island from Prince Patrick Island and Melville Island.

It is home to at least fourteen mammal species including the Peary caribou, barren-ground caribou, and polar bears. At one time over 68,000 muskoxen lived on the island, the majority of the world's population. However, the bacterium Erysipelothrix rhusiopathiae has led to a sharp decline in their numbers. The island is the summer home to hundreds of thousands of migratory birds who nest at  Banks Island Migratory Bird Sanctuary No. 1 and Banks Island Migratory Bird Sanctuary No. 2.

As of the 2016 census it had a human population of 103, all in Sachs Harbour.

Human settlements and discoveries 

Pre-Dorset cultural sites have been found that date from approximately 1500 BCE but European contact came much later. In 1820 it was seen from Melville Island by Sir William Edward Parry and named "Banks Land" in honour of Sir Joseph Banks. However, during the later exploration of the area by the McClure Arctic Expedition the island was marked on their maps as "Baring Island". McClure's ship, was frozen in Prince of Wales Strait. That spring he sent out sledging parties and determined that Banks Island was an island. In the following year he almost circumnavigated the island but was again frozen in at Mercy Bay where he and his crew spent the next three months before making their escape across the ice.

The only permanent settlement on the island is the Inuvialuit hamlet of Sachs Harbour (Ikahuak), on the southwest coast.

Description
Banks Island covers an area  and it is the world's 24th largest island and Canada's fifth largest island.

Ecology

Banks Island is home to two-thirds of the world's population of lesser snow geese, which make their way across the Amundsen Gulf from the mainland. There is an annual goose hunt in the spring out of Sachs Harbour. The island is part of the tundra world biome, which has extremely cold winters. The island is home to barren-ground caribou, polar bears, muskoxen, and birds, including year round residents the common raven and ptarmigan.

Two federal migratory bird sanctuaries were founded on the island in 1961.

The park has the highest concentration of muskoxen on earth, and is home to the endangered Peary caribou. The Thomsen River runs through the park, and is the northernmost navigable river (by canoe) in North America. Ptarmigan and ravens are considered the only year-round birds in the park, although 43 species make seasonal use of the area. In Inuvialuktun, Aulavik means "place where people travel" and the "wildlife and land have supported aboriginal peoples for more than 3,400 years, from Pre-Dorset cultures to contemporary Inuvialuit."

The first confirmed grizzly–polar bear hybrid found in the wild was shot on Banks Island in April 2006, near Sachs Harbour.

Climate
Banks Island has a tundra climate (Köppen ET) typical of the Canadian Arctic with long, cold winters and short, cool summers. Since the activities of many residents of the community revolve around fishing, hunting, and travel, many residents have considerable knowledge of weather conditions, permafrost, and even erosion patterns.

HMS Investigator
In July 2010, Parks Canada archaeologists looking for  found it 15 minutes after they started a sonar scan of Banks Island's Mercy Bay. The archaeology crew had no plans to raise the ship. They planned to conduct a thorough sonar scan of the area, then send a remotely operated vehicle.

References

Further reading

 Canada. Banks Island, a Natural Area of Canadian Significance. Natural area of Canadian significance. Ottawa: Parks Canada, 1978.
 Cotter, R. C., and J. E. Hines. 2001. "Breeding Biology of Brant on Banks Island, Northwest Territories, Canada". Arctic. 54: 357–366.
 Gajewski, K, R Mott, J Ritchie, and K Hadden. 2000. "Holocene Vegetation History of Banks Island, Northwest Territories, Canada". Canadian Journal of Botany. 78: 430–436.
 Holyoak, D. T. Notes on the Birds of Southwestern Banks Island, Northwest Territories, Canada. Bulletin of the British Ornithologists' Club, Vol.103,No.2, June. 1983.
 Manning, T. H., E. O. Höhn, and A. H. Macpherson. The Birds of Banks Island. 1956.
 Stephens, L. E., L. W. Sobczak, and E. S. Wainwright. Gravity Measurements on Banks Island, N.W.T. Gravity map series, no. 150. Ottawa: Dept. of Energy, Mines and Resources, Earth Physics Branch, 1972.
 Stephenson, S.A. 2010. Fishes of the Thomsen River, Banks Island, Northwest Territories. Can. Manuscr. Rep. Fish. Aquat. Sci. 2944: vi + 44 p.
 Struzik, Ed. 2000. "AND THEN THERE WERE 84,000 – The Return of Musk-Oxen to Canada's Banks Island in Recent Decades Is Just One Chapter of a Beguiling Arctic Mystery". International Wildlife. 30, no. 1: 28.
 Will, Richard T. Utilization of Banks Island Muskoxen by Nineteenth Century Copper Inuit. [S.l.]: Boreal Institute for Northern Studies, 1983.

External links
 Historical sites of the Northwest Passage
 Chart of the Northwest Passage
 Banks Island at civilization.ca
 Banks Island Archaeological Site Early Dorset artifacts collected by the Prince of Wales Northern Heritage Centre, Northwest Territories, Canada.

 
Islands of the Northwest Territories
Inhabited islands of the Canadian Arctic Archipelago
Islands of the Beaufort Sea